The Central Zoo(Nepali:सदर चिडियाखाना) is a  zoo in Jawalakhel, Nepal. It is home to some 870 animals in 109 species, and is operated by the National Trust for Nature Conservation (NTNC). Although it was originally a private zoo, it was opened to the public in 1956.

During the Bhoto Jatra festival, celebrated near the zoo, the zoo may see upwards of 34,000 visitors in a single day after they come to see a historical jeweled vest at the culmination of the Rato Machchhindranath jatra.

History

The Central Zoo was established in 1932 by Rana Prime Minister Juddha Shumser as a private zoo, and came under government control in 1950. it was built by General Maheshwar Shamshere Rana, PM Juddha Shamshere’s grandson. It was opened to the public in 1956, and in December 1995, the government handed over responsibility of the zoo to the National Trust for Nature Conservation. Although work is not complete, the NTNC has been upgrading the facilities so that animals can live in larger enclosures that simulate their natural environment. It is also working towards turning the zoo into a research and educational facility, as well as remaining a tourist attraction.

The central pond at the zoo was built during the rule of King Siddhi Narsingh Malla, and at one time was the source of water for Patan.

Animals

The zoo is home to about 870 animals in 109 species, including 15 of 38 endangered local species including Royal Bengal tigers and one-horned rhinoceros, as well as many animals from around the world including hippos, siamang, ostriches, chimpanzee, lemur, and many birds. It also has an aquarium for subtropical fish.

Mammals at the zoo include:

 Asian elephant

 Assam macaque

 rhesus macaque

 common langur 

 François' langur

 Lion tailed macaque

 vervet monkey

 patas monkey

 mona monkey

 ring-tailed lemur

 siamang

 chimpanzee

 spotted deer

 sambar deer

 four-horned antelope

 wild boar 

 sloth bear

  leopard

 clouded leopard

 large Indian civet

 Common palm civet

 Himalayan palm civet

 Northern palm squirrel

 Mongoose

 red panda

 barking deer

 Albino Muntjak

 blackbuck

 blue bull

 Himalayan goral

  crested porcupine 

 Himalayan black bear

 Himalayan blue sheep

 hippopotamus

 jackal

 jungle cat

 leopard cat

 rhinoceros

 Bengal tiger

 swamp deer

 striped hyena

 Indian palm squirrel  

  Wild water buffalo.

Reptiles at the zoo include:  

 Aldabra tortoise

 rock python 

 cobra

 Chinese alligator 

 Mugger Crocodile

 Gharial

 monitor lizard

 Yellow-headed temple turtle

 Indian roofed turtle

 Tricarinate hill turtle

 Pond turtle

Birds at the zoo include:
 
 Grey parrot

 Peacock

 Albino Peacock

 Himalayan monal 

 speckled pigeon

 Fantail pigeon

 Java sparrow

 Guinea fowl

 Common quail

 black-necked stork 

 black-headed ibis

 Lady Amherst pheasant

 Ring-necked pheasant

 Golden pheasant 

 Reeve's pheasant

 kalij pheasant

 silver pheasant

 Common ostrich

 bar-headed goose

 grey heron

 Himalayan griffon vulture

 Black kite

 Common kestrel

 Great horned owl

 Barn owl

 dusky eagle owl

 Eurasian eagle owl

 sarus crane

 White-naped crane

 Common crane

 Demoiselle crane

 Oriental pied hornbill 

 Spoon bill

 Chukar partridge

 Myna

 Lesser whistling duck

 Blue rock pigeon

 blue-and-yellow macaw

 Rainbow lorikeet

 white pelican

 sulphur crested cockatoo

 Salmon-crested cockatoo

 white cockatoo

 love bird
 
 Chestnut munia

 Spotted munia

 Red munia

 Indian silverbill

 satyr tragopan

 zebra finch

 rose-ringed parakeet

 Alexandrine parakeet

 Red-breasted parakeet

 white stork

 Greylag goose

 ruddy shelduck

 Comb duck

 wood duck

 cockatiel

 lesser adjutant

 common emerald dove

 emu among many more

Animals in The Central Zoo of Nepal as of April 2011

Other facilities

The zoo includes a library, a children's small fun park , picnic areas and paddle boats on the lake. Fishing is allowed in the lake during some parts of the year.

Gallery

References

External links

Central Zoo Official website
Project Page on NTNC Official website
NTNC Official Website

Zoos in Nepal
Zoos established in 1932
Lalitpur District, Nepal
1932 establishments in Nepal